Scargo Hill is a mountain in Barnstable County, Massachusetts. Scargo Tower is located at the summit. Black Ball Hill is located southwest and Hokum Rock is located southeast of Scargo Hill.

References

Mountains of Massachusetts
Mountains of Barnstable County, Massachusetts